Us & Them is an American sitcom based on the British series Gavin & Stacey created by James Corden and Ruth Jones. It was adapted for an American audience by David J. Rosen. The series was scheduled to premiere on Fox as a mid-season replacement in the 2013–14 season; however, Fox did not air the series. Instead, streaming service Crackle streamed all seven episodes on October 1, 2018.

Premise
After a six-month-long online romance, Gavin, who lives in New York, and Stacey, who lives in Pennsylvania, decide to meet in person.  Their crazy families and friends constantly interfere in their budding relationship, which becomes more of a challenge than living in different states.

Cast
 Jason Ritter as Gavin
 Alexis Bledel as Stacey
 Dustin Ybarra as Archie, Gavin's best friend
 Ashlie Atkinson as Nessa, Stacey's best friend
 Michael Ian Black as Brian, Stacey's uncle
 Jane Kaczmarek as Pam, Gavin's mother
 Kurt Fuller as Michael, Gavin's father
 Kerri Kenney-Silver as Gwen, Stacey's mother
 Aasif Mandvi as Dave Coaches, Nessa's ex and a security guard for the Dave Matthews Band

Production and release
The series was scheduled to premiere on Fox as a mid-season replacement in the 2013–14 season. On May 8, 2013, Fox placed a thirteen-episode order for the single-camera comedy. On October 11, 2013, it was revealed that Fox had cut back the episode order to seven episodes. In 2014, Vulture revealed that Fox would not air the series. The series was first broadcast in South Africa on M-Net.  All seven episodes were available on Korean major IPTV networks. However, in September 2018, streaming service Sony Crackle announced it would be streaming all seven episodes starting October 1, finally giving the show its American release.

Episodes

References

External links
 

2018 American television series debuts
2018 American television series endings
2010s American romantic comedy television series
2010s American single-camera sitcoms
American television series based on British television series
Television series by Sony Pictures Television
Television shows set in New York City
Television shows set in Pennsylvania
Unaired television shows